The 1962 North Dakota gubernatorial election was held on November 6, 1962. Democrat William L. Guy defeated Republican nominee Mark Andrews with 50.44% of the vote.

For the last time, the Governor of North Dakota was elected to a two-year term. Afterwards, North Dakota governors would be elected for terms of four years.

Primary elections
Primary elections were held on June 26, 1962.

Democratic primary

Candidates
William L. Guy, incumbent Governor

Results

Republican primary

Candidates
Mark Andrews, Republican national committeeman

Results

General election

Candidates
William L. Guy, Democratic
Mark Andrews, Republican

Results

References

1962
North Dakota
Gubernatorial
November 1962 events in the United States